Aleksey Lavrik (born 7 August 2000) is a Belarusian footballer who plays for Energetik-BGU Minsk.

He is a son of Belarusian coach and former international footballer Andrei Lavrik.

References

External links

2000 births
Living people
Belarusian footballers
Association football defenders
FC Minsk players
FC Energetik-BGU Minsk players